John Cary (c. 1754–1835) was an English cartographer

John Cary may also refer to:

John Cary (died 1395), Chief Baron of the Exchequer & MP for Devon
John Cary (valet), George Washington's valet
John W. Cary, American politician
John Cary (MP), in 1397, MP for Salisbury (UK Parliament constituency)
John Cary (businessman), prominent Bristol merchant and writer on matters regarding trade during the eighteenth century, mercantilist
John Robert Cary, Physicist

See also
John B. Cary Elementary School
John Carey (disambiguation)
John Kerry, politician